Paramount Bank, is a commercial bank in Kenya. It is one of the forty-four commercial banks licensed by the Central Bank of Kenya, the national banking regulator.

Paramount Bank is a small retail bank in Kenya. , the bank was ranked number 37, by assets, out of 43 licensed commercial banks in the country. The bank is an active member of the MoneyGram money transfer network.

History
The bank was established in 1993, as a deposit-taking, non-bank financial institution called Combined Finance Limited. The company's share capital at that time was approximately US$300,000 (KES:25 million). In 1995, after increasing its share capital and following the issuance of a commercial banking license, the company rebranded to Paramount Bank Limited, and began banking operations. In 2000, Paramount Bank merged with Universal Bank Limited to form Paramount Universal Bank.

Ownership
, Paramount Universal Bank is a privately held company whose owners are not publicly known.

Branch network
The bank maintains a network of branches at the following locations, as of January 2015:
 Westlands Branch - Sound Plaza, Woodvale Grove, Westlands, Nairobi (main branch)
 Parklands Branch - Amani Plaza, 3rd Parklands Avenue, Parklands, Nairobi
 Kimathi House Branch - Kimathi House, City Centre, Nairobi
 Koinange Street Branch - Paramount Bank House, Koinange Street, Nairobi
 Mombasa Branch - Jubilee Building, Moi Avenue, Mombasa
 Eldoret Branch - Karims Hardware Building, Oloo Street, Eldoret
 Industrial area Branch - Dar es Salaam Road Nairobi

See also
 List of banks in Kenya
 Central Bank of Kenya
 Economy of Kenya

References

External links
 Website of Paramount Universal Bank
 Website of Central Bank of Kenya

Banks of Kenya
Companies based in Nairobi
Banks established in 1993
Kenyan companies established in 1993